Carillons, musical instruments of bells in the percussion family, are found on every inhabited continent. The Netherlands, Belgium, and the United States contain more than two thirds of the world's total, and over 90 percent can be found in either Western Europe (mainly the Low Countries) or North America.

Criteria for inclusion
The  (WCF) defines a carillon as an instrument of at least 23 cast bronze bells hung in fixed suspension, played with a traditional keyboard of batons, and tuned in chromatic order so that they can be sounded harmoniously together. It may designate instruments of 15 to 22 bells built before 1940 as "historical carillons". Its member organizationsincluding for example The Guild of Carillonneurs in North America, the German Carillon Association, and the Flemish Carillon Associationalso define a carillon with those restrictions. Conversely, TowerBells.orga database of tower bells of all typesdefines a "non-traditional" carillon, which is an instrument that has had some component electrified or computerized. These instruments fail to meet the definitions of a carillon defined by the associations of carillonneurs mentioned above. This list contains only those carillons that meet the definition outlined by an association of carillonneurs, such as the WCF and its member organizations.

Africa

Réunion
 Cilaos: 48 bells, 1996

South Africa
 Cape Town: City Hall40 bells, heaviest , John Taylor & Co at various dates between 1905 and 1953

Asia

Israel 
Israel has one carillon, located at the Jerusalem International YMCA. It was installed and dedicated along with the rest of the newly constructed building in 1933. Gillett & Johnston cast the original 35 bells, the heaviest of which weighs . In 2018, Royal Eijsbouts cast a 36th bell, weighing , for the instrument. It is one of the only carillons in the Middle East.

Japan 
Japan has been exposed to carillons through its relations with Belgium. Since the 1980s, Belgium has used a targeted cultural diplomacy program to expose Japanese artists and students to the carillon, and to encourage them to construct instruments in their country. The city and province of Antwerp and the city of Mechelen provided Osaka with a mobile carillon in 1984. Hasselt donated a carillon to Itami, its sister city, in 1990. Members of the Shinji Shumeikai religious movement, inspired by their trip to St. Rumbold's Cathedral in Mechelen, purchased a carillon for Shigaraki in 1990. The Japanese School of Brussels and the Royal Carillon School "Jef Denyn" established educational relations on playing and composing for the carillon.

 Itami: The Bells of Flanders43 bells, heaviest , Royal Eijsbouts 1990
 Sasebo, Nagasaki: Carillon Symphonica in the 'Huis ten Bosch'37 bells
 Shigaraki: 'The Joy of Angels' at Misono, the international headquarters and spiritual centre of the Shinji Shumeikai organisation50 bells, heaviest unlisted, Royal Eijsbouts 1990

Philippines 
Malolos, Bulacan, Luzon: In front of the Malolos Cathedral, a carillon tower of 23 bells was constructed in celebration of the Golden Jubilee of the Diocese of Malolos in 2012.
Manila, Metro Manila, Luzon: The Lina Group of Companies donated 23 bells to the Manila Cathedral in 2014 to replace the 14 existing chime bells in preparation for the apostolic visit of Pope Francis to the country in 2015.
Parañaque, Metro Manila, Luzon:  In front of the Baclaran Church or National Shrine of Our Mother of Perpetual Help. The Carillon belfry was built as part of the Shrine's redevelopment plan and on September 8 of the same year, Archbishop of Manila Luis Antonio Cardinal Tagle blessed the newly built belfry. This is the first time the Shrine has had a bell tower in 60 years.
Quezon City (Diliman), Luzon: 'The Bells of Diliman' in the Andrés Bonifacio Centennial Carillon Tower at the University of the Philippines Diliman. 1952, 36 bells by Petit & Fritsen. (Originally 46 bells by Van Bergen, until 2007.)

South Korea 
 Daejeon: 77 bells, Petit & Fritsen 2001, additional 78th bell weighing  is not part of the carillon and only strikes the hour

Europe

Belgium

British Isles

France 

Albi: Notre-Dame de la Drêche's church31 bells
Annecy: Couvent de la Visitation37 bells, Fonderie Paccard.
 Arbois: 20 bells, heaviest unlisted, Goussel 1738, Fonderie Paccard 1913/1922, Bollée 1970
 Avranches: 30 bells, total weight , unknown 1762, Bollée 1899, Cornille-Havard 1982
 Bergues: 50 bells, total weight , J. Blampain 1628, Crouzet-Hildebrand 1880, and Fonderie Paccard 1961/1973
Blois: Notre-Dame-de-la-Trinité's Basilica48 bells, Fonderie Paccard
 Bourbourg: 50 bells, total weight , Fonderie Paccard 2009
 Cappelle-la-Grande: Belfry of Cappelle-la-Grande48 bells, total weight , Fonderie Paccard 1985
 Carcassonne:
 Basilique Saint-Nazaire38 bells
 Église Saint-Vincent54 bells
Castelnaudary: St Michel's Collegiate Church35 bells, Fonderie Paccard
 Castres: 34 bells, total weight , unknown 1650, Louison 1847, and Fonderie Paccard 1976/2016
 Châlons-en-Champagne: Notre-Dame-en-Vaux56 bells, heaviest unlisted, bellfounders unlisted
Chambéry: Château des Ducs de Savoie, 70 bells, Paccard.
 Châtellerault: Church of Saint-Jacques52 bells, heaviest unlisted, Bollée 1867 and Fonderie Paccard 1952
Cholet: Sacré-Coeur's Church49 bells, Fonderie Paccard and Royal Eijsbouts
Dijon: Carillon St Bénigne63 bells, Paccard
 Douai: 62 bells, heaviest , Wauthy 1924 and Fonderie Paccard 1954/1974.
 Dunkirk: 50 bells, total weight , Fonderie Paccard 1962 and 2009
 Gourdon, Lot: 24 bells, total weight , Fonderie Paccard 1986
 Grézieu-la-Varenne: Saint-Roch Church30 bells, total weight , Chevalier 1825 and Fonderie Paccard 1939/2020
 Hombleux: Church of Saint-Médard16 bells (historical carillon), total weight , Fonderie Paccard 1931
 Hondschoote: St. Vaast Church61 bells, total weight , Fonderie Paccard 1999
Lyon: 65 bells, Bell Tower of the City Hall.
Lisieux: Ste Therese' basilica51 bells, Fonderie Paccard
Magalas: Vins et Campanes's Museum40 bells, Michiels
 Maubeuge: 28 bells, total weight , Causard 1965 and Fonderie Paccard 1975
Montpellier: St François's church26 bells, Fonderie Paccard
 Miribel, Ain: 50 bells, total weight , Fonderie Paccard 1938–41
Narbonne: St Just's Cathedral36 bells, Fonderie Paccard
 Orchies: Orchies Cathedral47 bells, total weight , Metz 1994–95
 Pamiers: Pamiers Cathedral49 bells, total weight , Fonderie Paccard 1988 and 1994
Perpignan: Cathédrale Saint-Jean-Baptiste, 46 bells
 Poligny, Jura: 17 bells (historical carillon), heaviest unlisted, Farnier 1878–93 and Fonderie Paccard 1954
 Rouen: Rouen Cathedral64 bells, total weight , Fonderie Paccard at various dates between 1920 and 2016
 Saint-Amand-Les-Eaux: 48 bells, total weight , Barbieux 1784, Michiels 1931, Fonderie Paccard 1950, and Cornille-Havard 1984
 Saint-Gaudens, Haute-Garonne: Collegiate Church of Saint Peter and Saint Paul36 bells, heaviest unlisted, Arnoldus Senherri 1356, Pourcel 1879, and Fonderie Paccard 1980/1981
 Saint-Quentin, Aisne: 37 bells, total weight , Cylindre Van Rie 1924
Saint-Vincent-de-Paul, Landes: 60 bells, Fonderie Paccard
 Seurre: St. Martin's Church47 bells, total weight, Fonderie Paccard 1991–94
Taninges: The parish church's 1939 15-bell chime became in 1998 a 26-bell carillon. 40 bells since 2000, Fonderie Paccard and Royal Eijsbouts.
Tourcoing: Cathedral60 bells, plus a carillon museum located in the tower.
 Villefranche-de-Rouergue: 48 bells, total weight , Fonderie Paccard at various dates between 1636 and 1971, Dubois Frères 1819, and Cornille-Havard-Bergamo 2014

Germany 
According to the German Carillon Association, there are 49 carillons located throughout Germany. In 4 citiesBerlin, Bonn, Cologne, and Hamburgthere are at least two. Germany has two mobile carillons, "headquartered" in Passau and Rostock. The largest carillon by number of bells is located in Halle (Saale) and has 74. The association, unlike Towerbells.org, does not count carillons that have any component of its action electrified or that are not playable with a traditional baton keyboard.

 Aachen: Aachen Town Hall49 bells, heaviest , Royal Eijsbouts 1979
 Altenburg: 24 bells, heaviest ,  1981
 Aschaffenburg: 48 bells, heaviest , Royal Eijsbouts 1969
 Berlin:
 French Cathedral60 bells, heaviest , / 1987
 St. Nicholas Church41 bells, heaviest ,  1987
 52 bells, heaviest , Petit & Fritsen/Royal Eijsbouts 2016
 Carillon in Berlin-Tiergarten68 bells, heaviest , Royal Eijsbouts 1987
 Bonn
 Bad Godesberg city park23 bells, heaviest , Royal Eijsbouts 1979
 62 bells, heaviest ,  1962
 Buchen: City tower24 bells, heaviest , Royal Eijsbouts 2015
 Chemnitz: New Town Hall48 bells, heaviest ,  1978
 Cologne
 Cologne City Hall48 bells, heaviest , Royal Eijsbouts 1958
 Marienkirche38 bells, heaviest unlisted, Royal Eijsbouts 2010
 Düren: St. Annakirche37 bells, heaviest , Petit & Fritsen 1964
 Emmerich am Rhein:  Aldegundiskirche43 bells, heaviest , Petit & Fritsen 2000
 Eppingen:  Stadtpfarrkirche49 bells, heaviest , Karlsruher Glockengießerei 1987
 Erfurt: Bartholomäusturm60 bells, heaviest ,  1979
 Frankfurt: Old St. Nicholas Church47 bells, heaviest ,  1939, Royal Eijsbouts 1957–59 and 1997
 Geisa: Saints Philip and Jacob Church49 bells, heaviest , Royal Eijsbouts 2003
 Gera: Town hall37 bells, heaviest , / 1988
 Goslar: Gustav-Adolf-Stabkirche49 bells, heaviest , /Perner/Otto Buer 2002–05
 Halle (Saale): Red Tower76 bells, heaviest , /Glockengießerei Metz 1993
 Hamburg:
 St. Christian's Church42 bells, heaviest ,  1938
 St. Nicholas Church51 bells, heaviest , Royal Eijsbouts 1992
 Hanover: 49 bells, heaviest ,  1960
 Heidelberg: Heidelberg Town Hall26 bells, heaviest ,  1961
 Herrenberg: Collegiate church50 bells, heaviest , Royal Eijsbouts 2012
 Illertissen: St. Martin's Church51 bells, heaviest , Royal Eijsbouts 2006
 Kaiserslautern: Collegiate church47 bells, heaviest ,  2009
 Kassel: Karlskirche47 bells, heaviest ,  1957, Karlsruher Glockengießerei 1989, Otto Buer 1995
 Kiel: 50 bells, heaviest , /Karlsruher Glockengießerei 1999 and Otto Buer 2005
 Lößnitz: St. John's Church23 bells, heaviest ,  1939
 Lübeck: St. Mary's Church37 bells, heaviest ,  1906 and  2019
 Magdeburg: Town Hall47 bells, heaviest , / 1974
 Melle: Town Hall37 bells, heaviest , Royal Eijsbouts 2010
 Munich: 65 bells, heaviest , Royal Eijsbouts/Czudnochowsky/Gloria 2012
 Offenburg: Old Town Hall25 bells, heaviest , // 1989

 Potsdam: 24 bells, heaviest ,  1985
 Rockenhausen: 37 bells, heaviest , Royal Eijsbouts 2014
 Rostock: 32 bells, heaviest , / 1986

 Saalfeld: Park Keep25 bells, heaviest ,  1924/1986
 Schirgiswalde: Catholic church29 bells, heaviest unlisted, / 1991
 Schwerin: Historical Town Hall26 bells, heaviest ,  1988
 Wechselburg: Catholic collegiate church36 bells, heaviest , // 1988
 Weilbach: Old Schoolyard39 bells, heaviest , Glockengießerei Metz 2006
 Wiesbaden: Marktkirche49 bells, heaviest ,  1862,  1962, and Royal Eijsbouts 1986
 Würzburg: University of Würzburg51 bells, heaviest , Petit & Fritsen 2005

Netherlands 

Alkmaar:
 Waag, 47 bells by Melchior de Haze and Royal Eijsbouts
 Grote or St. Laurenskerk, 37 bells by Melchior de Haze and Royal Eijsbouts
Almere
 Haven: 47 bells by Royal Eijsbouts
 Stad: 47 bells by Royal Eijsbouts
Amersfoort:
 Belgian Monument housing carillon frequently used for practice by students of the Netherlands Carillon School. 48 bells.
 Onze Lieve Vrouwe Toren. Two functional carillons, the older with 35 bells, the newer with 58. Old carillon: Hemony (1659–1664), plus 3 bells by Melchior de Haze and Pieter Hemony (1674), by Jan Albert de Grave (1725), and by Royal Eijsbouts (1953). New carillon: Royal Eijsbouts 1997.
 Amsterdam:
 Carillons in the Westertoren, Munttoren, cupola of the Royal Palace, Zuidertoren, Rijksmuseum, Plein '40-'45, Jewelry Siebel in the Kalverstraat, the Vrije Universiteit and Oude Kerkstoren.
 Slotermeer: Freedom Carillon31 bells, heaviest , Van Bergen 1952 and Petit & Fritsen 1995
Arnhem: St Eusebius' Church53 bells, heaviest , Petit & Fritsen of various dates between 1958 and 1994
Barneveld : Jan van Schaffelaar Toren. 51 bells
 Bergen: 26 bells, heaviest , Petit & Fritsen 1970
Bergen op Zoom: Stadstoren de Peperbus. 48 bells by Eijsbouts
Brunssum:
 Gemeentehuis. 38 bells.
 Bakkerij vanEeghem. 23
Cuijk
Den Helder: Nationaal Monument voor het Reddingswezen, 30 bells by Van Bergen and 19 bells from a later date.
Doesburg: Martinikerk48 bells, heaviest , Hemony brothers 1654 and Royal Eijsbouts 1964/2015
Dordrecht: Grote-Kerkstoren. 67 bells, 52 t: heaviest carillon in Europe and eighth heaviest in the world.
Eindhoven:
 City Hall
 St. Catharinakerk
 Demer
Emmeloord: Poldertoren. 48 bells.
Enkhuizen:
 The Zuider- St Pancrastoren. 52 bells. François and Pierre Hemony
 The Drommedaris. 39 bells. Pieter Hemony
Enschede: Carillon at the University of Twente.
Garderen: Oude Kerkstoren. 44 bells. Carillon designed and built by Het Molenpad Expertise. Bells tuned to 'Bach temperament'.
Gouda: Sint Janstoren. 50 bells
 Groningen:
 Academy Building, University of Groningen
 Martinitoren, 52 bells.
 The Hague: Peace Palace48 bells, heaviest , Royal Eijsbouts of various dates between 1994 and 2013
Heerlen: Sint Pancratiustoren. 49 bells
 Heiligerlee: National Monument for Mobilisation Victims of the First World War49 bells, heaviest , Van Bergen 1965 and 1967–68
Hilvarenbeek: Sint Petrustoren. 50 bells by Van Bergen (1949) and Rudolf Perner (2010).
Hilversum: Raadhuis Hilversum Town Hall 48 bells by Klokkengieterij Eysbouts, Asten NL (1958).
Hoorn: Grote Kerk. 52 bells by Van Bergen and Eijsbouts
Kampen: Nieuwe Toren (new tower) - 48 bells by François Hemony (2011)
Maastricht:
 Sint Servaastoren. 59 bells
 Stadhuistoren. 43 bells. by François and Pierre Hemony 1663/1664
Roermond: Roermond City Hall. 49 bells, 4 octaves to be played automatic or manual.
 Meppel: Meppeler Carillon47 bells, heaviest , Van Bergen 1948–49 and Eijsbouts 1973
Moordrecht: Dorpstoren. 43 bells by Eijsbouts (1960) and Rudolf Perner (2011)
Nijmegen: St. Stevenschurch. 47 bells by A.J vd Gheyn and Eijsbouts
 Oosterbeek: Oosterbeek Town Hall37 bells, heaviest , Royal Eijsbouts 1966 and 1974
Roosendaal
Schoonhoven: Stadhuis. 50 bells, largest set of bells by Andreas Joseph van den Gheyn (1767 - 1777)
Utrecht: Dom Tower. 50 bells.
Venlo: Sint Martinustoren. 54 bells.
Venray: Sint Petrus' Banden-toren. 50bells.
 Waalre: Provincial Memorial Monument37 bells, heaviest , Petit & Fritsen 1950 and 2007
Weert: Sint Martinustoren. 49 bells
Zierikzee:
 City Hall. 38 bells by Taylor/Eijsbouts
 Zuidhavenpoort. 12 bells 1550-1554 by Peter I van den Ghein,
Zutphen: Wijnhuistoren, 47 bells mostly by Eijsbouts, but including the low octave E1 bell by Pieter and François Hemony, created in Zutphen (1644) for the first ever made well tuned carillon.

Nordic countries
According to the Nordic Society for Campanology and Carillons, there are 56 carillons in the Nordic countries: 29 in Denmark, 1 in Finland, 12 in Norway, and 14 in Sweden.

Denmark

 Aalborg: Budolfi Church48 bells, heaviest , Petit & Fritsen 1970 and 2008
 Aarhus: Aarhus City Hall48 bells, heaviest unlisted, Sørensen 1948,  1964, 2017 Thubalka
 : 27 bells, heaviest , Royal Eijsbouts 2011
 Brøndby Strand: 48 bells, heaviest , Petit & Fritsen 1986
 Copenhagen:
 Church of Our Saviour48 bells, heaviest , Sørensen/Smithske 1928 and Petit & Fritsen 1981
 Church of the Holy Ghost49 bells, heaviest , Thubalka 1947 and Royal Eijsbouts 2003
 38 bells, heaviest , Petit & Fritsen 1970
 Faaborg: 38 bells, heaviest , Petit & Fritsen 1960
 Frederiksberg: Frederiksberg Town Hall48 bells, heaviest , Sørensen 1953 and Thubalka 2012
 Frederikshavn: 24 bells, heaviest , Petit & Fritsen 1985
 Grenaa: 48 bells, heaviest , Fonderie Paccard 1995 and Thubalka 2012
 Herning: 48 bells, heaviest , Fonderie Paccard/Thubalka 1989
 Hillerød: Frederiksborg Castle28 bells, heaviest , Van Aerschodt 1887 and Thubalka 2003
 Holbæk: 48 bells, heaviest , Royal Eijsbouts 1979 and Thubalka 2009
 Holstebro:
 48 bells, heaviest , Royal Eijsbouts 1969 and Thubalka 1999
 Saint George's Church48 bells, heaviest , Royal Eijsbouts/Thubalka 1974
 Holte: 27 bells, heaviest , Michiels 1929 and Thubalka 2014
 Kalundborg: Church of Our Lady48 bells, heaviest , Fonderie Paccard 2013
 Kolding: 48 bells, heaviest , Petit & Fritsen 1973

 Løgumkloster: Carillon Park49 bells, heaviest , Petit & Fritsen 1973

 Marstal: 48 bells, heaviest , Royal Eijsbouts 1988 and Thubalka 2012
 Odense: St. Canute's Cathedral48 bells, heaviest , Petit & Fritsen 1989
 Randers: St Martin's Church48 bells, heaviest , Petit & Fritsen 1994
 Silkeborg: 48 bells, heaviest , Petit & Fritsen 1966 and Thubalka 2008
 : Rohden Gods48 bells, heaviest , Royal Eijsbouts 2010 and Thubalka 2012
 Svendborg: 36 bells, heaviest ,  Søorensen 1946, Petit & Fritsen 1958, and Royal Eijsbouts 2009/2011
 Thisted: 48 bells, heaviest , Fonderie Paccard 2003 and Thubalka 2012
 Varde: 42 bells, heaviest , Petit & Fritsen 1963
 Vejle: St. Nicolai Church48 bells, heaviest , Royal Eijsbouts 1976 and Thubalka 1980

Finland
 Vantaa: Tikkurila Church31 bells, heaviest , Royal Eijsbouts 2020, Finland's first-ever carillon

Norway
 Bærum: 39 bells, heaviest unlisted, Olsen Nauen 2009
 Bergen: St John's Church48 bells, heaviest , Royal Eijsbouts 2014
 Bodø: Bodø Cathedral49 bells, heaviest unlisted, Royal Eijsbouts 2011
 Drammen: Bragernes Church35 bells, heaviest unlisted,  1961
 Haugesund: 38 bells, heaviest unlisted, Olsen Nauen 2013
 Molde: Molde Cathedral26 bells, heaviest unlisted, Olsen Nauen 1983
 Oslo:
 Oslo City Hall49 bells, heaviest unlisted, Olsen Nauen 1999
 Oslo Cathedral48 bells, heaviest unlisted, Olsen Nauen 2003
 Uranienborg Church37 bells, heaviest unlisted, Olsen Nauen 2004
 Sandefjord: 49 bells, heaviest unlisted,  1931 and Royal Eijsbouts 2016
 Stavanger: Stavanger Cathedral49 bells, heaviest unlisted, Warner 1922 and Olsen Nauen 1998/2000
 Trondheim: Nidaros Cathedral37 bells, heaviest unlisted, Olsen Nauen 1976

Sweden
 Gävle: Gävle Town Hall36 bells, heaviest ,  1972
 Gothenburg: German Church, Gothenburg42 bells, heaviest ,  1961
 Härnösand: Härnösand Cathedral37 bells, heaviest ,  1981
 Karlskrona: Fredrik Church35 bells, heaviest ,  1967
 Landskrona: Sofia Albertina Church43 bells,  1967
 Linköping: 36 bells, heaviest ,  1972
 Malmö: 48 bells, heaviest , Petit & Fritsen 1970
 Norrköping: Norrköping Town Hall48 bells, heaviest ,  1963 and 1983

 Stockholm:
 St. Gertrude's Church37 bells, heaviest , Hemony brothers 1665, Petit & Fritsen 1875,  1888, and Royal Eijsbouts 2008
 Hedvig Eleonora Church24 bells, heaviest ,  1968
 Klara Church35 bells, heaviest ,  1965
 Västerås: 47 bells, heaviest , Royal Eijsbouts 1960
 Växjö: Växjö Cathedral25 bells, heaviest ,  1962
 Visby: Visby Cathedral45 bells, heaviest ,  1960

Other regions

Austria
Heiligenkreuz Abbey, which claims to be the only Cistercian institution that owns a carillon, acknowledges that the tradition of playing carillons is not popular in Austria.

 Heiligenkreuz: Heiligenkreuz Abbey43 bells, heaviest unlisted, Royal Eijsbouts 1982–2004
 Innsbruck: Innsbruck Cathedral48 bells, heaviest , Royal Eijsbouts 1979 and at some point before

Bosnia and Herzegovina
 Medjugorje: St. James Church47 bells, Royal Eijsbouts 1990

Czech Republic
 Prague:
 30 bells, Fremy 1683–91, Lisiak 1747, Manousek 1994
 (mobile carillon) "The Traveling Carillon of Prague"57 bells,  total weight, Royal Eijsbouts 2001

Lithuania
 Gelgaudiškis: Gelgaudiškis Manor. 36 bells by Royal Eijsbouts (2015)
 Kaunas: Vytautas the Great War Museum. 49 bells (1937/2006)
 Klaipėda: Tower of Central Post Office. 48 bells by Royal Eijsbouts (1987/2006)
 Šakiai: 24 bells by Royal Eijsbouts (2015)
 Telšiai: Cathedral Square. 23 bells by Royal Eijsbouts (2017)
 Vilnius: Church of Sts Apostles Philip and James. 61 bells by Royal Eijsbouts (2015)

Luxembourg
 Echternach: 50 bells, Reuter 2008

Poland
Annual concerts since 1999 during the Gdańsk Carillon Festival. See also Traveling carillons below.
Gdańsk: St Catherine's Church - 50 bells, 17 t, 1998 (1989-2006), Royal Eijsbouts. Previous instruments: 1738–1905, 1910-1942
Gdańsk: Main Town Hall - 37 bells, 3.3 t, 2000, Royal Eijsbouts. Previous instrument: 1561-1945
Częstochowa: Jasna Góra Monastery - 36 bells, 1906

Portugal
 Alverca: 69 bells, heaviest unlisted, Royal Eijsbouts 2005
 Constância (mobile carillon): "Lvsitanvs Carillon"63 bells, total weight , Royal Eijsbouts 2010s
 Leiria: Igreja de São Pedro47 bells, heaviest unlisted, Petit & Fritsen 2004, unknown bellfounder after 2004
 Mafra:
 Palace of Mafra:
 South tower53 bells, heaviest unlisted, Witlockx/Van Aerschodt 1730, Royal Eijsbouts 1986
 North tower45 bells, heaviest unlisted, Levache et al. 1730, Van Aerschodt 1928
 Porto: Clérigos Church49 bells, heaviest unlisted, Royal Eijsbouts 1996

Russia
 Saint Petersburg:
 Saints Peter and Paul Cathedral51 bells, heaviest unlisted, Petit & Fritsen 2001
 Peterhof Palace51 bells, heaviest unlisted, Petit & Fritsen 2005

Serbia
 Belgrade: Church of Saint Sava45 bells, heaviest , Grassmayr 2001

Spain

 Barcelona: Palau de la Generalitat de Catalunya49 bells, Petit & Fritsen 1977
 Bilbao: Basilica of Begoña24 bells, 
 Córdoba: San Pablo36 bells, Fonderie Paccard 1900, unknown bellfounder 1998
 San Lorenzo de El Escorial: El Escorial47 bells, de Haze 1676 and Royal Eijsbouts 1988
 Villarreal: 72 bells, Royal Eijsbouts 1997

Switzerland
 Carouge: Église Sainte-Croix36 bells, heaviest unlisted, Aubry 17th century, Pitton 1787, Kervand 1839, and Rüetschi 2001
 Geneva: St. Pierre Cathedral37 bells, heaviest unlisted, Fribor 1460, Paccard-Rüetschi 1931, Rüetschi 1986/1991, and Fonderie Paccard 2011
 Lens: Eglise Saint-Pierre-aux-Liens24 bells, heaviest unlisted, Rüetschi at various dates between 1958 and 1995
 Pully: Église de Rosiaz48 bells, heaviest unlisted, by Royal Eijsbouts 1953, Rudolf Perner 2011, and Laudy 2014.
 Saint-Maurice: Abbaye49 bells, heaviest unlisted, Rüetschi 1947, Royal Eijsbouts 2004, and Fonderie Paccard 2010

Ukraine

 Hoshiv: Basilian Monastery50 bells, heaviest unlisted, Petit & Fritsen 2013
 Kyiv:
 St. Michael's Golden-Domed Monastery50 bells, heaviest unlisted, [Ukrainian bellfounders] 1997
 St. Nicholas Military Cathedral51 bells, heaviest unlisted, Royal Eijsbouts 2018
 St.Theodosius Pechersky Monastery51 bells, heaviest unlisted, Royal Eijsbouts 2018
 Kolomyia: Saint Josaphat Kuntsevych51 bells, heaviest unlisted, Royal Eijsbouts 2019

North America

Bermuda
 Pembroke: St John the Evangelist Anglican Church25 bells, John Taylor & Co 1970

Canada

 Guelph: St. George's Church36 bells, 1926
 Hamilton, Ontario: Cathedral of Christ the King23 bells, 1933
 Montreal: Saint Joseph's Oratory56 bells, 1956
 Niagara Falls: Rainbow Tower55 bells, 1947
 Ottawa:
 Peace Tower53 bells, heaviest , Gillett & Johnston 1927
 St-Jean-Baptiste Church47 bells, 1940
Simcoe: Norfolk War Memorial23 bells, 1925
 Toronto:
 Soldiers' Tower (University of Toronto)51 bells, heaviest , Gillett & Johnston 1927 and Petit & Fritsen 1975
 Exhibition Place Carillon50 bells, 1974
 Massey/Drury Memorial Carillon at Metropolitan United Church. 54 bells, increased from 23 bells in 1922.
 Victoria: Netherlands Centennial Carillon62 bells, heaviest , Petit & Fritsen 1967 and 1971

Cuba
 Havana: Our Lady of Lourdes Church49 bells, Petit & Fritsen 1958

Curaçao
 Willemstad: Curaçao Museum47 bells, heaviest , Royal Eijsbouts 1951

El Salvador
 San Salvador: Don Rua Church35 bells, Petit & Fritsen 1963

Honduras
 Tegucigalpa: 42 bells, Petit & Fritsen 1960

Mexico 
 Mexico City, D.F.: The Banobras Carillon. 47 bells, in the world's tallest carillon tower (125m), which is part of the old headquarters of the Banco Nacional de Obras y Servicios Publicos in the Tlatelolco neighbourhood.
 San Luis Potosí, San Luis Potosí, The San Luis Potosí Cathedral has a carillon installed in 2010 with 32 bells. In addition, it has an electronic device that rings the bells when the cathedral clock strikes the hour.

Nicaragua
 León: Cathedral of St. Peter25 bells, Petit & Fritsen 1959

United States 

Selections of notable carillons in the United States:
 Albany, New York: Albany City Hall49 bells , John Taylor & Co 1986 and 1989
 Allendale, Michigan: Cook Carillon Tower (Grand Valley State University), 48 bells, heaviest , Royal Eijsbouts 1994
 Ann Arbor, Michigan:
 Burton Memorial Tower (University of Michigan)55 bells, heaviest , John Taylor & Co 1936 and 2011
 Lurie Tower (University of Michigan)60 bells, heaviest , Royal Eijsbouts 1996
 Arlington, Virginia: Netherlands Carillon53 bells, heaviest , Van Bergen/Petit & Fritsen/Royal Eijsbouts 1954, Royal Eijsbouts 1995 and 2020
 Austin, Texas: Main Building (University of Texas at Austin)56 bells
 Berkeley, California: Sather Tower (University of California, Berkeley)61 bells, 1917, 1978, and 1983.
 Dayton, Ohio: Deeds Carillon, Carillon Historical Park, 1942. 57 bells by Petit & Fritsen. Refurbished in 1988 from an electronic to a traditional carillon.
 Detroit, Michigan: Nancy Brown Peace Carillon49-bells, 1940 and 2005
 East Lansing, Michigan: Beaumont Tower (Michigan State University)49 bells, 1928, 1935, and 19__, renovated by Royal Eijsbouts 1996
 Gainesville, Florida: Century Tower (University of Florida)61 bells, heaviest , Royal Eijsbouts 1979 and 2003
 Grand Rapids, Michigan: The Beckering Family Carillon on the Pew Campus of Grand Valley State University.
 Lake Wales, Florida: Singing Tower (Bok Tower Gardens)60 bells, heaviest  John Taylor & Co 1928
 Lawrence, Kansas: World War II Memorial Carillon (University of Kansas)53 bells, heaviest , John Taylor & Co 1949–51
 Mercersburg, Pennsylvania: Mercersburg Academy50 bells, heaviest , Gillett & Johnston 1926, Meeks & Watson 1996, and Whitechapel 2008
 Nashville, Tennessee: Belmont Tower and Carillon (Belmont University)43 bells, heaviest , Gillett & Johnston 1928
 New Haven, Connecticut: The Yale Memorial Carillon in Harkness Tower at Yale University, 1922. 54 bells, by Taylor (originally a chime of 10 bells; additional 44 bells installed 1966).
 New York City: Riverside Church74 bells, heaviest , Gillett & Johnston 1925 and 1931, Van Bergen 1976, and Whitechapel 2003, moved from Park Avenue in 1929
 Norwood, Massachusetts: Norwood Memorial Municipal Building50 bells, heaviest , Gillett & Johnston 1928/1935 and John Taylor & Co 1983
 Provo, Utah: Brigham Young University Centennial Carillon Tower52 bells, heaviest , Petit & Fritsen 1975
 Raleigh, North Carolina: North Carolina State University Memorial Belltower55 bells, heaviest  B.A. Sunderlin Bellfoundry 2021
 Rochester, Minnesota: Plummer Building (Mayo Clinic)56 bells, heaviest , Gillett & Johnston 1927–28, Petit & Fritsen 1977, and John Taylor & Co 2006
 Santa Barbara, California: Storke Tower (University of California, Santa Barbara)61 bells, heaviest , Petit & Fritsen 1969
 Springfield, Illinois: Thomas Rees Memorial Carillon67 bells, heaviest  Petit & Fritsen 1962 and 2000

Oceania

Australia 

 Bathurst: Carillon War Memorial47 bells, heaviest , John Taylor & Co 1933
 Canberra: National Carillon57 bells, heaviest unlisted, John Taylor & Co 1970 and 2003
 Sydney: War Memorial Carillon (University of Sydney)54 bells, heaviest , John Taylor & Co 1927 and Whitechapel 2003

New Zealand 
 Wellington: National War Memorial Carillon74 bells, heaviest , Gillett & Johnston 1928–29, John Taylor & Co 1985, and Royal Eijsbouts/Whitechapel/Lips 1995

South America

Brazil
 Belo Horizonte: Exact location uncertain38 bells, Van Bergen 1959
 São Paulo:
 São Paulo Cathedral61 bells, Petit & Fritsen 1959
 Vila Formosa Catholic Church47 bells, Royal Eijsbouts 1951

Suriname 

 Paramaribo: Vaillantsplein Square25 bells, Royal Eijsbouts 1978

Uruguay
 Alejandro Gallinal: 23 bells, Petit & Fritsen 1962

Venezuela
 San Cristóbal: Iglesia de Los Recolletos23 bells, Petit & Fritsen 1963

Traveling carillons
Traveling or mobile carillons are those which are not housed in a tower. Instead, the bells and keyboard are installed on a frame that allow it to be transported. These carillons are often constructed by bellfounders for advertising purposes, though several exist solely to perform across the world. According to a count by the World Carillon Federation, there are 18 existing mobile carillons headquartered in 11 countries.

 Barcelona, Spain: "Bronzen Piano 'Reverté van Assche50 bells,  total weight, cast by Eijsbouts, completed in 2013, owned by Anna Maria Reverté & Koen van Assche
 Béthune, France: "Carillon Christophe"48 bells, unknown total weight, cast by Petit & Fritsen, constructed in 1938 (expanded in 1998), owned by Association Polyphonia
 Constância, Portugal: "Lvsitanvs Carillon"63 bells,  total weight, cast by Royal Eijsbouts owned by the International Center for the Carillon and the Organ
 Dordrecht, Netherlands: "Bell Moods"50 bells,  total weight, cast by Petit & Fritsen, completed in 2003, owned by Boudewijn Zwart
 Douai, France: "The Walking Carillon of Douai"53 bells,  total weight, cast by Petit & Fritsen, compleded in 2004, owned by the City of Douai
Gdańsk, Poland: "Gdańsk"48 bells,  total weight, cast by Royal Eijsbouts, completed in 2009, fixed on a trailer pulled by MAN 11.168 firetruck
 Løgumkloster, Denmark: "The Transportable Chime"50 bells,  total weight (including the instrument's truck), cast by Petit & Fritsen, owned by the Løgumkloster Church Music School. Includes an additional  swinging bell
 Maastricht, Netherlands: "Traveling Carillon Frank Steijns"43 bells,  total weight, cast by Petit & Fritsen, completed in 2006 (replaced in 2011), owned by Frank Steijns
 Mechelen, Belgium: 30 bells, unknown total weight, cast by unknown bellfounder, owned by Our Lady of Hanswijk
 Mons, Belgium: "Carillon Queen Fabiola"49 bells,  total weight, cast by unknown bellfounder, owned by Catiau Montois and Carillons Association
 Nagasaki, Japan: 50 bells, unknown total weight, cast by unknown bellfounder
 Neerpelt, Belgium: The carillon of carillonneur Jan Verheyen from "Bells Lab"
 Osaka, Japan: 37 bells, unknown total weight, cast by unknown bellfounder
 Passau, Germany: "The Mobile Perner-Carillon"49 bells,  total weight, completed in 2009, cast and owned by Rudolf Perner GmbH & Co.
 Pottstown, Pennsylvania, US
 "CariBelle"35 bells,  total weight, cast by Petit & Fritsen, completed in 1980, owned by Frank DellaPenna, originally called "America's Only Traveling Carillon," part of the "Cast in Bronze" band group
 "DellaPenna Traveling Carillon"35 bells,  total weight, cast by Petit & Fritsen (originals) and Eijsbouts (enlargement), completed in 1951 (enlarged in 2010), owned by Frank DellaPenns, part of "Cast in Bronze" band group
 Prague, Czech Republic: "The Traveling Carillon of Prague"57 bells,  total weight, cast by Royal Eijsbouts, completed in 2001
 Ripalta Cremasca, Italy: "Fonderia Allanconi Carillon"25 bells
 Rostock, Germany: "Concert Carillon Olaf Sandkuhl"37 bells, unknown total weight, cast by Petit & Fritsen, owned by Olaf Sandkuhl

See also

List of musical instruments

Notes

References

External links

List of carillons worldwide - by the World Carillon Federation
List of indexes to traditional carillons worldwide - various indexes point to individual pages giving details of each known instrument
Locator map set for traditional carillons worldwide - at TowerBells.org
10 Great Places to Chime in with the Bells, article published December 2, 2004 in USA Today.

 
Articles containing video clips